The South Central Ambulance Service NHS Foundation Trust (SCAS) is the ambulance service for the counties of Berkshire, Buckinghamshire, Oxfordshire and Hampshire. It is a foundation trust of the National Health Service, and one of ten NHS ambulance trusts in England. As of August 2022, SCAS is currently rated Inadequate by the CQC following multiple failings within the trust. SCAS is the only Ambulance Service in England to have received this rating.

Services
As an ambulance service, SCAS primarily responds to emergency 999 calls, in addition to calls from the NHS non-emergency number, 111. These services are provided in an area that roughly covers the counties of Buckinghamshire, Oxfordshire, Berkshire and Hampshire. The exceptions are North East Hampshire which is served by South East Coast Ambulance Service (SECAmb) and the Shrivenham area of Oxfordshire, which is served by South Western Ambulance Service (SWAS).

The service also provides an emergency transport service for patients in life-threatening condition and a non-emergency patient transport service (NEPTS). The NEPTS transports patients unable to use public transport due to their medical conditions, patients using outpatient clinics and patients being admitted or discharged from hospital. The trust also has a commercial division, which provides first aid training to members of the public, a community equipment service and logistic services. Since 2017, SCAS has also run the NEPTS in Sussex and Surrey, within the South East Coast ambulance area.

It has a resilience and specialist operations department which plans for major or hazardous incidents. This includes a Hazardous Area Response Team (HART), which responds to emergencies involving chemical, biological, radiological or nuclear materials, as well as major incidents. The trust also trains and supports volunteer community first responders (CFR).

The service is supported by its own League of Friends, a registered charity. The South Central Ambulance League of Friends raises funds that are used to enhance the standard of care for patients, provide additional benefits for service personnel, encourage the acquisition of essential life-support skills among the public, and support the deployment of volunteer community first responders. This group had been founded in 1982 to raise funds for the former Oxfordshire Ambulance NHS Trust.

SCAS supplements deployment with co-responders from both the Fire Service, Police and British Armed Forces who combined with CFR volunteers attended 35,716 emergency incidents in the 2020/2021 period.

In addition, SCAS has close operational relations with both Hampshire and Isle of Wight Air Ambulance and Thames Valley Air Ambulance who both provide charitable critical care services.  This is further supported by the UK BASICS sceme that has operational volunteers across the south central region providing enhanced critical care clinicians.

SCAS continues to have close working relations with the Isle of Wight NHS Trust by directly supporting their 999 and Ambulance operations.

History

South Central Ambulance Service NHS Trust was formed on 1 July 2006, following the merger of the Royal Berkshire Ambulance Service NHS Trust, the Hampshire Ambulance Service NHS Trust, the Oxfordshire Ambulance NHS Trust, and part of the Two Shires Ambulance NHS Trust. The trust achieved Foundation status on 1 March 2012, becoming known as South Central Ambulance Service NHS Foundation Trust.

In June 2011, it was named England's top performing ambulance service, managing to respond to 77.5% of Category A calls within the 8-minute target time, compared to the national average of 74.9%. In October 2011, the BBC discovered that SCAS spent more on private ambulance services to cover 999 calls than any other service in the country.

On 1 March 2012, the trust became an NHS foundation trust.

In October 2013, the trust accidentally published on its website a document listing the age, sexuality and religion of all its 2,826 staff.

SCAS took over patient transport services in Hampshire in October 2014. In 2014, the trust held a recruitment drive in Poland to help fill vacancies. On 1 November 2016, it was announced that the trust would take over the running of NEPTS in the south-east of England from April 2017. The service had previously been run by South East Coast Ambulance Service until 1 April 2016, when it had been taken over by Coperforma, a private-sector provider which had been unable to provide a satisfactory level of service.

In 2015, the trust established a subsidiary company, South Central Fleet Services Ltd, to which 41 estates and facilities staff were transferred. The intention was to achieve VAT benefits, as well as pay bill savings, by recruiting new staff on less expensive non-NHS contracts. VAT benefits arise because NHS trusts can only claim VAT back on a small subset of goods and services they buy. The Value Added Tax Act 1994 provides a mechanism through which NHS trusts can qualify for refunds on contracted out services.

In 2020, SCAS set up and ran the National Covid Response Service (CRS), a public telephone advice line in response to the COVID-19 pandemic. SCAS call takers answered around 2.5m calls in the first two recognised waves of the outbreak in the UK. This was later accompanied by the vaccine booking and advice service which has taken over 5.5m calls and booked 2.2m appointments.

In late 2021 and into 2022, SCAS experienced continued high patient demand on its 111 and 999 services. This was highlighted by SCAS declaring a critical incident on 31 October 2021, due to an "overwhelming" number of emergency calls, on 18 February 2022 due to storm Eunice, and for a third time on 6 April 2022, due to extreme pressures across the service.

As of August 2022, SCAS was rated Inadequate by the CQC following failings within the trust, and has been served warning notices to act upon.

In the days leading up to Christmas 2022, SCAS once again declared a critical incident due to service demand attributed to 999 calls being 50% higher, and 111 calls being 75% higher than the same period in 2021.
On 21 December, some ambulance staff went on strike as part of the wider national ambulance strikes due to ongoing disputes over pay, working conditions, and hospital handover delays.

Performance 
Performance of SCAS is provided by national NHS England Ambulance Quality Indicators.
In February 2016:
The trust managed to respond to 70% of Red 1 calls within 8minutes (5% below the national target)
68% of Red 2 calls were responded to within 8minutes (7% below the national target)
93% of Red 19 calls were responded to within 19minutes (2% below the national target)
 Cardiac arrest survival rates were 16% (5% above the national average)
 53% of stroke patients arrived at a thrombolysis centre within 60 minutes of their calls (1% above national average)
 The average time to answer 999 calls was 43seconds (38seconds below the national target)
 There were 21,024 incidents requiring patients being taken to an A&E department
 42% of 999 patients were treated by paramedic crews only.

Subcontracting
In 2019, the Care Quality Commission reported that ambulance services were relying on private providers because of lack of capacity. The trust spent more than £15million in 2018/9 on private ambulances and taxis, which dealt with 989,811 999 incidents, an increase from 917,521 the previous year.

CQC performance rating
In August 2022 the Care Quality Commission (CQC) announced, following an inspection in April and May 2022, that SCAS has now been rated as inadequate and has been served warning notices following failings in Senior Leadership, Safeguarding, Non-functional equipment and Serious Incident Reporting. The CQC gave the following ratings on a scale of outstanding (the service is performing exceptionally well), good (the service is performing well and meeting our expectations), requires improvement (the service isn't performing as well as it should) and inadequate (the service is performing badly):

Notes

See also
 Emergency medical services in the United Kingdom
 NHS ambulance services prior to 2006
 Hampshire and Isle of Wight Air Ambulance
 Thames Valley Air Ambulance

References

External links 

 
 Inspection reports from the Care Quality Commission

NHS ambulance services trusts
Health in Buckinghamshire
NHS foundation trusts
Health in Hampshire
Health in Berkshire
Health in Oxfordshire
Ambulance services in England